Brazzacott or Brazacott is a hamlet in east Cornwall, England,  United Kingdom. It is situated in the civil parish of North Petherwin and is six miles north-west of Launceston
.

References

Hamlets in Cornwall